Riddings Junction railway station was a railway station in Cumbria, England, from 1862 to 1967 on the Border Union Railway.

History 
The station opened on 1 March 1862 by the Border Union Railway. The station was situated at the end of an unnamed minor road. The goods yard was moderately sized and was on a lower level than the station. It was composed of three sidings, the siding to the north serving a cattle dock and pens. The station closed to passengers on 15 June 1964. The station remained open to goods traffic although it was downgraded to a public delivery siding on 8 November 1965 and it closed on 2 January 1967.

References

External links 

Disused railway stations in Cumbria
Railway stations in Great Britain opened in 1862
Railway stations in Great Britain closed in 1964
Beeching closures in England
Former North British Railway stations
1862 establishments in England